Kamuran Toktanış (born 16 December 1974) is a Turkish footballer. He plays as a midfielder.

Career 
Toktanış began his professional career with Kurtalan Belediyespor football club in 1996. After playing for a short time he paused his football career to attend university. In 2001, he graduated with a degree in Political Science and Public Administration from Eastern Mediterranean University (Doğu Akdeniz Üniversitesi). 

In 2008, he was selected to be a member of the United States Ministry of Foreign Affairs, which consist of a group of 18 people selected from Turkey to receive leadership training at the World Learning Center in Washington DC and Cleveland. During this period, he became acquainted with the Amish, attracting media attention from Turkey.

Since 2012, Toktanış has worked as an educator providing training and governmental support for entrepreneurs in Turkey, focusing on self-employment and accessing channels for finance to help individuals establish businesses.

Toktanış  has organized exhibitions, symposia, and conferences in Turkey and in other countries.

Personal life 
Toktanış married in 2006 and is the father of two girls, Solin and Zeynep Dicle. Kamuran speaks a variety of languages, including Turkish, Kurdish, and English fluently.

References

External links
 
 Kamuran Toktanış official website

1974 births
Living people
Turkish footballers
Association football midfielders